{{DISPLAYTITLE:Galactose 1-dehydrogenase (NADP+)}}

In enzymology, a galactose 1-dehydrogenase (NADP+) is an enzyme that catalyzes the chemical reaction

D-galactose + NADP+  D-galactonolactone + NADPH + H+

Thus, the two substrates of this enzyme are D-galactose and NADP+, whereas its 3 products are D-galactonolactone, NADPH, and H+.

This enzyme belongs to the family of oxidoreductases, specifically those acting on the CH-OH group of donor with NAD+ or NADP+ as acceptor. The systematic name of this enzyme class is D-galactose:NADP+ 1-oxidoreductase. Other names in common use include D-galactose dehydrogenase (NADP+), and galactose 1-dehydrogenase (NADP+). This enzyme participates in galactose metabolism.

References 

 
 
 
 

EC 1.1.1
NADPH-dependent enzymes
Enzymes of unknown structure